Henry Brooke (January 1671 – 14 July 1761) was an Irish politician.

He was the son of Thomas Brooke, grandson of Sir Basil Brooke, 1st Baronet, and his wife Catherine Cole, daughter of Sir John Cole, 1st Baronet. In 1709, he was appointed High Sheriff of Fermanagh and Governor of County Fermanagh. Between 1713 and 1727, he sat for Dundalk in the Irish House of Commons. Subsequently he was returned for Fermanagh until his death in 1761.

On 29 March 1711, he married Lettice Burton, daughter of Benjamin Burton. They had four daughters and two sons. His oldest son Arthur represented Fermanagh and Maryborough and was later created a baronet.

References

1671 births
1761 deaths
High Sheriffs of County Fermanagh
Irish MPs 1713–1714
Irish MPs 1715–1727
Irish MPs 1727–1760
Members of the Parliament of Ireland (pre-1801) for County Louth constituencies
Members of the Parliament of Ireland (pre-1801) for County Fermanagh constituencies